A Moon Child in the Sky is an album by Tsukiko Amano. The name is a play on the translation of her first name (月 (Tsuki) = Moon, 子 (Ko) = Child, 天 (Ama) = Sky or Heaven). It was released on September 21, 2005 on the Otokura Records label, and was distributed by Pony Canyon.

Track listing
 "A Moon Child in the Sky"
 "Devil Flamingo"
 "Joker Joe"
 
 "Stone"
 
 1/2 -a half-
 
 
 
 
 
 
Hidden track.

Tsuki Amano albums
2005 albums